Handunnetti Rannulu Wimalasiri (known as H. R. Wimalasiri) is a former member of the Parliament of Sri Lanka.

In 1994 he was elected for the seat of Devinuwara of Matara, Southern Province, Sri Lanka under United National Party. Currently, he is the Devinuwara United National Party (UNP) Chief Organiser.

Wimalasiri was educated at Nalanda College Colombo and was a member of the Nalanda College First XI cricket team playing for the 42nd Battle of the Maroons in 1971. This Nalanda team was captained by Bandula Warnapura and Sunil Jayasinghe and Jayantha Seneviratne were also members of it.

References

Living people
Members of the 10th Parliament of Sri Lanka
Sinhalese politicians
Sri Lankan Buddhists
Alumni of Nalanda College, Colombo
1953 births